Naxos Jet is a high speed catamaran operated by Seajets in the Aegean.

History
The Naxos Jet was built in 1992 as  Seacat Scotland for Sea Containers.  She was built to inaugurate a new fast ferry service between Stranraer and Belfast. Before commencing service on the North Channel she briefly operated on the Dover to Calais route for Hoverspeed.

During the winter of 1994/1995 she was chartered to middle eastern operator Q Ships for service across the Red Sea. for this role she was renamed Q Ship Express. During her charter the Stranraer – Belfast route was operated by Seacat Isle of Man. On completion of the charter she returned to the Stranraer – Belfast route, changing back to her original name.

Seacat Scotland was chartered again during the winter of 1997/1998. This time to Uruguayan ferry operator Navegacion Atlantida S.A. for service on the River Plate.  She returned to the North Channel for the 1998 summer season.  Sea Containers left Stranraer in 2000 in favour of Troon following heavy competition from Stena Line and P&O Irish Sea at Loch Ryan. Seacat Scotland operated the Belfast – Troon route until 2003 when she was replaced by the Rapide.

Seacat Scotland transferred to the Hoverspeed Dover – Calais route which she operated with Seacat Danmark and Seacat France. She remained on the English Channel until September 2005 when she was once again replaced by the Rapide.

She left Dover in September 2004 bound for the Pallion shipyard in Sunderland. She remained dry docked in Sunderland until she was sold to Fortune Maritime Enterprises . She left Sunderland in April 2007 bound for Keratsini as the Shikra.  Before entering service between Safaga and Dhuba she was renamed Al Huda I.

In July 2010 the Al Huda I arrived in Perama. During her refit she was repainted in NEL Lines livery and renamed Cyclades Express.

In early 2016, Cyclades Express was sold to the ferry company Seajets and is planned to be renamed Naxos Jet. Since 2016 in under the name of Naxos Jet and works every Summer from Piraeus to Aegean Islands

Sister ships
 Emeraude France
 HSC Sea Runner
 Snaefell
 Pescara Jet
 Condor 10
 Mandarin

There are also two other 74m hulls built by Incat but show clear differences to the standard 74m design ships above. These are:-
 Patricia Olivia – Modified passenger accommodation and forward windows.
 Atlantic III – Has the appearance of an Incat 78m design.

References

Ships of Seajets
Ferries of Greece
1991 ships
Ships built by Incat